Out of the Fog (working title: Danger Harbor) is a 1941 American film noir crime drama directed by Anatole Litvak, starring John Garfield, Ida Lupino and Thomas Mitchell. The film was based on the play The Gentle People by Irwin Shaw.

Plot
Two aging men, Goodwin and Johnson (Mitchell and Qualen), are fishermen in their spare time. They are trying to buy a new boat, but their Brooklyn pier is controlled by Goff, a gangster (Garfield), who extorts "protection" money of $5 a week from them.

Goodwin's daughter (Lupino) falls in love with Goff, who learns that Goodwin has tried to persuade her to holiday in Cuba. After he demands $190 from them, the sum Goodwin had promised his daughter, the fishermen plan to kill the gangster, but neither can go through with the act. The gangster attempts to strike one of them but falls into the sea and drowns. Goff turns out to have been a wanted man in five cities, and they recover the extorted money.

Cast

 John Garfield as Harold Goff
 Ida Lupino as Stella Goodwin
 Thomas Mitchell as Jonah Goodwin
 John Qualen as Olaf Johnson
 Eddie Albert as George Watkins
 George Tobias as Igor Propotkin
 Aline MacMahon as Florence Goodwin

 Jerome Cowan as Assistant district attorney
 Odette Myrtil as Caroline Pomponette
 Leo Gorcey as Eddie
 Robert Homans as Officer Magruder
 Bernard Gorcey as Sam Pepper
 Paul Harvey as Judge Moriarty

Reception
On release, the film was criticized due to changes from the play, and the box office gross was lower than expected.  A contemporary review from Bosley Crowther of The New York Times described it as "a heavy and dreary recital of largely synthetic woes, laced with moderate suspense and spotted here and there with humor".  Writing at Bright Lights Film Journal, Alan Kohn said, "As Goff, Garfield — the progressive, the true common man whose miserable fate it was to be destroyed through the Hollywood Blacklist travesty — reveals the depravity and fantasy of Depression-era capitalist society as he condemns all fascist forces at play in a world at war."

References

External links
 
 
 
 
 Out of the Fog informational site and DVD review at DVD Beaver (includes images) 
 

1941 films
1941 crime drama films
American crime drama films
American black-and-white films
Film noir
American films based on plays
Warner Bros. films
Films directed by Anatole Litvak
Films with screenplays by Robert Rossen
1940s English-language films
1940s American films